Giuliano Terraneo (born 16 October 1953) is an Italian former professional footballer who played as a goalkeeper.

Club career
After beginning his career with Seregno and Monza, Terraneo played for 11 seasons (321 games) in the Serie A for Italian clubs Torino Calcio, AC Milan and U.S. Lecce.

Style of play
Terraneo was an efficient rather than spectacular goalkeeper, who was known for his excellent positional sense and composure in goal. In addition to his goalkeeping ability, Terraneo also drew attention to himself for his moustache and original goalkeeping attire: he was known for wearing goalkeeping jerseys of different colours, as well as his trademark white shorts and socks; with Torino he also wore maroon football socks, the official colour of the team. He was also known for removing his gloves when attempting to save penalties.

Consultancy career
On 12 April 2018 Terraneo was appointed as technical consultant at EFL Championship club West Bromwich Albion to support their summer transfer plans following the sacking of Nick Hammond. Terraneo previously held similar positions at Monza, Lazio, Inter Milan and Fenerbahçe. Subsequently, Terraneo was replaced by Luke Dowling.

Honours
Monza
Coppa Italia Lega Pro: 1974–75
Serie C (Girone A): 1975–76
Anglo-Italian Cup: 1976

References

1953 births
Living people
Italian footballers
Association football goalkeepers
Serie A players
Serie B players
Serie C players
A.C. Monza players
Torino F.C. players
A.C. Milan players
S.S. Lazio players
U.S. Lecce players
U.S. 1913 Seregno Calcio players